Kevin Kinney may refer to:

 Kevn Kinney (born 1961), American vocalist and guitarist
 Kevin Kinney (politician) (born 1963), Iowa State Senator